The Central Plain Group is a geologic group in Antigua and Barbuda. It preserves fossils dating back to the Oligocene period.

See also 
 List of fossiliferous stratigraphic units in Antigua and Barbuda

References

Further reading 
 S. H. Frost and M. P. Weiss. 1979. Patch-reef communities and succession in the Oligocene of Antigua, West Indies. Geological Society America Bulletin 90:612-616

Geologic groups of North America
Geologic formations of the Caribbean
Geology of Antigua and Barbuda
Paleogene Caribbean
Limestone formations
Reef deposits